P. ehrenbergii may refer to:

 Platax ehrenbergii, a tropical fish
 Pleurotaenium ehrenbergii, a unicellular algae
 Poronia ehrenbergii, a sac fungus

See also

 P. ehrenbergi (disambiguation)